The John Marshall Review of Intellectual Property Law is a student-run law review covering legal scholarship in the field of intellectual property, established in 2001 at the John Marshall Law School (Chicago). The journal publishes four issues per year, which are available on LexisNexis and Westlaw. The United States Court of Appeals for the Federal Circuit has cited the journal as a source.

Notable contributions 
  John Paul Stevens, Section 43(A) of the Shakespeare Canon of Statutory Construction: The Beverly W. Pattishall Inaugural Lecture in Trademark Law, 1 J. Marshall Rev. Intell. Prop. L. 179 (2002). 
  Paul Redmond Michel, Founding a New Journal in the Age of Electronic Law, 1 J. Marshall Rev. Intell. Prop. L. 1 (2001). 
  Richard Linn, Effective Appellate Practice Before the Federal Circuit, 2 J. Marshall Rev. Intell. Prop. L. 1 (2002).
  Richard Posner, Transaction Costs and Antitrust Concerns in the Licensing of Intellectual Property, 4 J. Marshall Rev. Intell. Prop. L. 325 (2005).
  Q. Todd Dickinson, et al., The Genetic Age: Who Owns the Genome?, 2 J. Marshall Rev. Intell. Prop. L. 6 (2002) (symposium). 
  Marybeth Peters, Copyright & Privacy - Through the Legislative Lens, 4 J. Marshall Rev. Intell. Prop. L. 266 (2005).

References

External links 
 

American law journals
Technology law journals
Intellectual property law journals
English-language journals